Theophilus Hastings, 7th Earl of Huntingdon (10 December 165030 May 1701) was a 17th-century English politician and Jacobite. One of the few non-Catholics to remain loyal to James II of England after November 1688, on the rare occasions he is mentioned by historians, he is described as a 'facile instrument of the Stuarts,' a 'turncoat' or 'outright renegade.' 

Once the leading political power in Leicestershire, his family had declined in influence; regaining that position became his primary ambition and drove his political choices. During the 1679 to 1681 Exclusion Crisis, he supported the removal from the succession of the Catholic heir, James, Duke of York, before switching allegiance in 1681. James succeeded as king in 1685 with widespread support but this collapsed when his religious measures and the methods used to enforce them seemed to undermine the legal system and the Church of England. By the end of 1687, Huntingdon was one of the few non-Catholics who continued to actively implement his policies.

Even among those who considered James the legitimate king after 1688, the vast majority viewed the primacy of the Church of England as non-negotiable; Hastings was considered to have actively persecuted his own church, a distinction that damaged his reputation among his contemporaries. One of 30 individuals excluded from the 1690 Act of Grace, he lost his offices but continued to attend the House of Lords and remained a committed Jacobite. He was arrested and charged with treason in 1692, although charges were later dropped; shortly before his death in May 1701, he was one of five peers who voted against the 1701 Act of Settlement barring Catholics from the throne.

His daughter Lady Elizabeth Hastings (1682-1739) became a noted philanthropist and supporter of women's education who established the 'Lady Elizabeth Hastings Charities'.

Early life
Theophilus Hasting was born on 10 December 1650, fourth son of Ferdinando Hastings, 6th Earl of Huntingdon and his wife Lucy. His three elder brothers died before his birth and he succeeded his father in 1656 at the age of five. Once the pre-eminent family in Leicestershire, the Hastings declined in influence after decades of over-spending and losses incurred during the 1642 to 1651 Wars of the Three Kingdoms. The 6th Earl remained neutral but his younger brother Henry commanded the Royalist garrison holding the family seat of Ashby de la Zouch Castle, which this was partially destroyed by Parliamentarian forces in 1648.

 

The family relocated to their estate at Donington Hall, where Hastings was educated by his mother and his uncle Henry, who returned from exile after The Restoration in 1660. He was also created Baron Loughborough and Lord Lieutenant of Leicestershire, an office held by the Hastings family almost continuously between 1550 and 1642. After Henry died in 1667, he was replaced by John Manners, 8th Earl of Rutland and regaining this position became Hastings' overriding ambition.

In 1672, Hastings married Elizabeth Lewis (died 1688), whose sister Mary (died 1684) was the wife of the Earl of Scarsdale; the two were co-heiresses of Sir John Lewis, a wealthy merchant who owned Ledstone Hall, in West Yorkshire. They had nine children, only two of whom survived to adulthood; George, 8th Earl of Huntingdon (1677-1704) and Lady Elizabeth Hastings (1682-1739), a noted supporter of women's education.

Elizabeth died in 1688 and two years later, Hastings married Mary Fowler (1664–1723), the wealthy widow of Thomas Needham, 6th Viscount Kilmorey (1659-1687). They had two sons and four surviving daughters; Ann (1691-1755), Catherine (1692-1739), Frances (1693-1750), Theophilus, 9th Earl of Huntingdon (1696-1746), Margaret (1699-1768) and Ferdinando (1699-1726).

Career

Hastings took his seat in the Lords and was a reliable supporter of the Crown until 1677, when the 9th Earl of Rutland succeeded his father as Lord Lieutenant. The Manners family supported Parliament in the Civil Wars, and Hastings was frustrated by a perceived lack of gratitude for his family's service. He joined the faction led by Shaftesbury, who opposed Charles' efforts to rule without Parliament and campaigned against 'Popery and arbitrary government.' The potential succession of the Catholic, pro-French Duke of York was seen as another step towards absolutism and led to the 1679–1681 Exclusion Crisis. Hastings became a prominent supporter; at a public dinner in 1679, he proposed a toast to the Protestant Duke of Monmouth, viewed as an alternative to James, and 'confusion to Popery', prompting a heated exchange with other guests.

During the anti-Catholic campaign known as the Popish Plot in 1680, Hastings voted for the execution of Viscount Stafford, as did seven of eight members of Stafford's own family. It led to the execution of 22 alleged conspirators and caused widespread unrest; in August 1681, Titus Oates, source of the accusations, accused the Queen of conspiring to poison Charles.

This was seen as going too far and many now withdrew their support, including Hastings; banned from Court in 1680, he was restored to favour in October 1681. In February 1682, he paid Scarsdale £4,500 for his post as Captain of the Honourable Band of Gentlemen Pensioners, a ceremonial bodyguard with close access to the monarch. He was appointed to the Privy Council in 1683 and when James became king in February 1685, he was made Justice in eyre and colonel of an infantry regiment.

At the start of his reign, James had widespread backing, inheriting a legislature so dominated by his supporters it became known as the Loyal Parliament. Memories of the 1638 to 1651 Wars of the Three Kingdoms meant the majority feared the consequences of removing the 'natural' heir; this caused the rapid collapse of the Monmouth and Argyll rebellions in June 1685. However, the Church of England and the legal system were key elements of a stable society; James' religious policies undermined the former, and attempts to enforce them attacked the latter. When Parliament refused to pass his measures, it was suspended in November 1685 and thereafter he ruled by decree; the principle was accepted, but the scope and approach were not, and judges who opposed his interpretation were dismissed.

This forced James to rely on a few loyalists, one being Hastings, who was made a member of the Commission for Ecclesiastical Causes in July 1686. A number of people, including his first wife, accused him of being a secret Catholic; if true, this was controversial, since the Commission was set up to enforce compliance on the Church of England. Suspicions increased when he was exempted from the 1678 Test Act requiring officeholders to swear to uphold 'the Protestant religion.' In late 1687, James tried to ensure a Parliament that would vote for his Declaration of Indulgence; only those who confirmed their support for repealing the Test Act would be allowed to stand for election as Member of Parliament. Lord-Lieutenants were to administer the so-called 'Three Questions'; many resigned rather than do so, including Scarsdale, whom Huntingdon replaced as Lord Lieutenant of Derbyshire.

Combined with the trial of the Seven Anglican bishops for seditious libel in June 1688, James' policies now seemed to go beyond tolerance for Catholicism and Nonconformists and into an assault on the Church of England. James was now abandoned by most of his supporters, including Lord Chancellor Jeffreys; when he refused to sign the warrant committing the bishops to the Tower of London, Hastings did so instead, which was later held against him. 

Wild celebrations when the bishops were acquitted made it seem only James' deposition could prevent widespread civil unrest and the vast majority of his Tory supporters abandoned him. The seven signatories of the Invitation to William asking him to assume the English throne included representatives from the Tories, the Whigs, the Church and the Navy. During the Glorious Revolution in November 1688, Hastings and his regiment were sent to secure Plymouth; on arrival, he was arrested by its governor, the Earl of Bath, who declared for William. He was released on 26 December, two days after his wife died in childbirth; as one of thirty individuals exempted from the 1690 Act of Grace, he forfeited his offices although he continued to attend the Lords. 

He initially retained some local influence and in 1690, his support helped elect Sir Edward Abney, Tory candidate for Leicester. Thereafter the borough was dominated by the Manners family and he withdrew from active politics. As a committed Jacobite, Hastings was arrested during the 1692 invasion scare, allegedly because his stables were 'full of horses'. After the March 1696 Jacobite assassination plot, he voted against the execution of Sir John Fenwick and refused to take the loyalty oath imposed by Parliament. One of his last acts was to vote against the Act of Settlement that disinherited the Catholic Stuart exiles in favour of the Protestant Sophia of Hanover. His later years were dominated by a long-running legal dispute with his eldest son over his first wife's estates, which was settled only after his death. He died in London on 30 May 1701 and was succeeded by George, who served in the Low Countries during the War of the Spanish Succession and died of fever in 1705.

Although Hasting was a minor political figure and not unusual in changing sides, on the rare occasions he is mentioned by historians, he is described as a 'facile instrument of the Stuarts,' a 'turncoat' or 'outright renegade.' His reputation for inconsistency increased during the 1689 Convention Parliament, when he voted first against a Regency, then with the Jacobite loyalists, and finally in favour of making William king. Historian Peter Walker argues all other issues were secondary to restoring his family's position, but 'continued loyalty to James in his last years suggests (he) was not a man bereft of principle.'

References

Sources

External links
 
 
 

|-

1650 births
1701 deaths
Lord-Lieutenants of Derbyshire
Lord-Lieutenants of Leicestershire
Members of the Privy Council of England
Honourable Corps of Gentlemen at Arms
Theophilus Hastings, 07th Earl of Huntingdon
Somerset Light Infantry officers
7
Barons Hastings
English Jacobites
Barons Botreaux
Barons Hungerford